The chestnut-tailed antbird has been split into two species:
 Southern chestnut-tailed antbird, Myrmeciza hemimelaena
 Northern chestnut-tailed antbird, Myrmeciza castanea

Animal common name disambiguation pages